Aman Lal Modi (born 21 September 1985) is a Nepalese politician and social worker serving as the Member of House of Representatives from Morang 4. He was also a member of the 2nd Nepalese Constituent Assembly after being elected from the party list of the then Unified CPN (Maoist).

Early life 
Modi was born in Dangraha–4 (present day Budhiganga) in Morang District. He completed his bachelor's degree from Mahendra Morang Adarsh Multiple Campus.

Political career 
In 2003, Modi was elected as the district chairman of the All Nepal National Independent Students' Union (Revolutionary). He was a member of the Public Accounts Committee in the House of Representatives. In January 2014, he was elected as a member of then Constituency Assembly for the party list of the then Unified CPN (Maoist) and continued to be its member till its dissolution in October 2017.

He was elected to the Pratinidhi Sabha in the 2017 general election from the Morang 4 constituency and was subsequently re-elected in 2022. On 17 January 2023, he was appointed as the Minister of Federal Affairs and General Administration in the Third Dahal cabinet under the premiership of Pushpa Kamal Dahal.

References

Living people
Nepal MPs 2017–2022
1985 births
People from Morang District
Members of the 2nd Nepalese Constituent Assembly
Communist Party of Nepal (Maoist Centre) politicians
Nepal MPs 2022–present